Admiral Sir Irvine Gordon Glennie KCB (22 July 1892 – 8 September 1980) was a Royal Navy officer who went on to be Commander-in-Chief, America and West Indies Station.

Naval career
Educated as an officer cadet at the Royal Naval College, Osborne, and the Royal Naval College, Dartmouth, Glennie joined the Royal Navy in 1905 and served in the First World War in the Home Fleet and in the Grand Fleet. He joined the Staff at the Royal Naval College, Dartmouth in 1922 and then commanded Destroyers from 1925. He was appointed Flag Captain commanding  and Chief of Staff to the Commander-in-Chief of the New Zealand Division in 1936 before becoming Commander-in-Chief of the New Zealand Division in 1938.

He also served in the Second World War as Flag Captain commanding  and Chief of Staff of the Battle Cruiser Squadron from 1939; it was in this capacity that he took part in the Attack on Mers-el-Kébir in July 1940. He then served as Commander of Destroyers in the Mediterranean Fleet from 1941, taking part in the Battle of Crete and preventing Axis troops from landing on that island in May 1941, before becoming Commander of Destroyers in the Home Fleet from 1943. He was made Senior Naval Officer, Western Atlantic from 1944; this role evolved into Commander-in-Chief, America and West Indies Station in 1945. He welcomed President Harry S. Truman to Bermuda after the War and retired in 1947.

He died in 1980 at Lymington in Hampshire.

References

|-

1892 births
1980 deaths
Royal Navy admirals of World War II
Knights Commander of the Order of the Bath
Bermuda in World War II
People educated at the Royal Naval College, Osborne